Lage Fosheim Lund (born 12 December 1977) is a Norwegian jazz guitarist.

Early life and education 
Initially aspiring to become a professional skateboarder, Lund began playing guitar at the age of 13. He later founded a jazz trio and performing in local clubs. Lund earned a scholarship he attended the Berklee College of Music in Boston, where he regularly performed at Wally's Cafe. In 2002, Lund was the recipient of a Fulbright Foundation grant, which gave him the opportunity to move to New York City. In 2003, he entered the Juilliard School scholarship jazz program and graduated in 2005. He won the Thelonious Monk International Jazz Competition in 2005.

Career 
Lund has performed at Smalls Jazz Club, Jazz Gallery, Blues Alley, Kennedy Center, and Jazz at Lincoln Center. He has worked with Seamus Blake, Ingrid Jensen, Carmen Lundy, Wynton Marsalis, Eric Revis, Ron Carter, Mulgrew Miller, and Maria Schneider.

Honors 
2005: Winner of the Thelonious Monk International Jazz Guitar Competition

Discography

As leader
 Romantic Latino for Ladies (Leafage, 2006)
 Early Songs (Criss Cross, 2008)
 Unlikely Stories (Criss Cross, 2010)
 Four (Smallslive, 2012)
 OWL Trio (Losen, 2013)
 Foolhardy (Criss Cross, 2013)
 Idlewild (Criss Cross, 2015)
 Inspired with Rale Micic, John Abercrombie, Peter Bernstein (ArtistShare, 2016)
 Terrible Animals (Criss Cross, 2019)
 Life of the Party with OWL Trio (Newvelle, 2020)

As sideman
 Seamus Blake, Way Out Willy (Criss Cross, 2007)
 Seamus Blake, Bellwether (Criss Cross, 2009)
 Seamus Blake, Live at Smalls (Smallslive, 2010)
 Zach Brock, Purple Sounds (Criss Cross, 2014)
 Orlando le Fleming, From Brooklyn with Love (Nineteen-Eight, 2010)
 Jimmy Greene, Mission Statement (Razdaz, Sunnyside 2009)
 Jimmy Greene, While Looking Up (Mack Avenue, 2020)
 Ingrid Jensen, At Sea (ArtistShare, 2005)
 Carmen Lundy, Come Home (Afrasia, 2007)
 Michael Rosen, Sweet 17 (Via Veneto, 2015)
 Jochen Rueckert, We Make the Rules (Whirlwind, 2014)
 David Sanchez, Cultural Survival (Concord Picante, 2008)
 Maria Schneider, The Thompson Fields (ArtistShare, 2015)
 Jaleel Shaw, Perspective (Fresh Sound, 2005)
 Jaleel Shaw, Optimism (Changu, 2008)
 Leo Sidran, Cool School (Bonsai Music, 2018)
 Chihiro Yamanaka, Somethin' Blue (Blue Note, 2014)
 Melissa Aldana, 12 Stars (Blue Note, 2022)

References

External links 

1977 births
Living people
Chesky Records artists
Criss Cross Jazz artists
Losen Records artists
Male jazz composers
Musicians from Skien
Norwegian expatriates in the United States
Norwegian jazz composers
Norwegian jazz guitarists
21st-century Norwegian guitarists
21st-century Norwegian male musicians